Bigoli  (Venetian: bìgołi) is an extruded pasta in the form of a long and thick strand. Initially bigoli were made with buckwheat flour, but are now more commonly made with whole wheat flour, and sometimes include duck eggs. The preparation is then extruded through a bigolaro, from which the pasta gets its name.

Bigoli is a term used in Veneto; a similar type of pasta called pici is produced in Tuscany.

History 
There are different versions of the origins of the bigoli. They only agree that they originated in what is now the Veneto region. According to one theory, its origin dates back to the 14th century during the Venetian Turkish Wars. After the Turks sank numerous Venetian ships loaded with durum, the remaining flour was stretched with common wheat flour. The new mixture was used for a dough, formed into a large spaghetto and called a bigolo.

In 1604, a pasta maker from Padua named Bartolomio Veronese, known as Abbondanza, patented a press for making bigoli. This was the real triumph of the bigoli.

According to another version, the bigoli are the result of a further development of a type of pasta that was already widespread in Northeast Italy. They were first mentioned as bigoli in the 15th century at the court of the Bishop of Eraclea.

See also
Bigoli in salsa
Macaroni
Venetian cuisine
Pici

References

 
 
 

Types of pasta
Cuisine of Veneto